In enzymology, a 1-phosphatidylinositol-3-phosphate 5-kinase is an enzyme that catalyzes the chemical reaction
ATP + 1-phosphatidyl-1D-myo-inositol 3-phosphate ⇌ ADP + 1-phosphatidyl-1D-myo-inositol 3,5-bisphosphate

Thus, the two substrates of this enzyme are ATP and 1-phosphatidyl-1D-myo-inositol 3-phosphate, whereas its two products are ADP and 1-phosphatidyl-1D-myo-inositol 3,5-bisphosphate.

This enzyme belongs to the family of transferases, specifically those transferring phosphorus-containing groups (phosphotransferases) with an alcohol group as acceptor.  The systematic name of this enzyme class is ATP:1-phosphatidyl-1D-myo-inositol-3-phosphate 5-phosphotransferase. Other names in common use include type III PIP kinase, and phosphatidylinositol 3-phosphate 5-kinase.  This enzyme participates in phosphatidylinositol signaling system and regulation of actin cytoskeleton.

References 

 

EC 2.7.1
Enzymes of unknown structure